Josef Thomas Peterhans (4 December 1882 – 3 February 1960) was a German stage and film actor.

Biography 
Peterhans began his stage career in 1902, aged twenty. He began his film acting career with the film  in 1916. Before acting in films he played at theaters in the province and in Berlin. He served in the military from 1914 to 1917. He continued his career by playing supporting roles in films like  (1917),  (1918),  (1919). In  he had starred alongside the famous actress Fern Andra. The last one was rejected by the British Board of Film Classification on grounds of prostitution depicted in the film.

Peterhans played a supporting character in the 1925 -directed Chronicles of the Gray House. From 1926 to 1931 he appeared in only two films  Night of Mystery (1927) and Panic (1928). After the advent of talkies he again became active in the film industry and starred in several films including The Pride of Company Three (1931) and The Mad Bomberg (1932). He also played the role of an Indian in Indian Revenge (1920) and in the double roles in The Tiger of Eschnapur and The Indian Tomb (both 1938). His last film was Die Entlassung (1942). He spent his life in Berlin-Steglitz. He ended his career with the second World War.

Selected filmography 

 Spring Storms (1918)
 Crown and Whip (1919)
 Indian Revenge (1920)
 Christian Wahnschaffe (1920)
 The Haunting of Castle Kitay (1920)
 William Tell (1923)
 Chronicles of the Gray House (1925)
 The Poacher (1926)
 Night of Mystery (1927)
 Panic (1928)
 Marschall Vorwärts (1932)
 The Mad Bomberg (1932)
 The Pride of Company Three (1932)
 Today Is the Day (1933)
 William Tell (1934)
 Victoria (1935)
  (1935)
 Fridericus (1937)
 The Tiger of Eschnapur (1938)
 The Indian Tomb (1938)
 Comrades at Sea (1938)
 Trenck, der Pandur (1940)
 Jud Süß (1940)
 The Great King (1942)
 Die Entlassung (1942)

References

External links 

 

1882 births
1960 deaths
German male stage actors
German male film actors
German male silent film actors
People from Achern
20th-century German male actors